The Eternal Triangle is an album by trumpeters Freddie Hubbard and Woody Shaw recorded in June 1987 and released on the Blue Note label. It features performances by Hubbard, Shaw, Ray Drummond, Carl Allen, Mulgrew Miller and Kenny Garrett. The album followed the first Hubbard/Shaw collaboration Double Take (1985) and the two volumes were combined for the double CD release The Complete Freddie Hubbard and Woody Shaw Sessions (1995).

Track listing
 "Down Under" (Hubbard) - 7:35
 "The Eternal Triangle" (Sonny Stitt) - 7:49  
 "The Moontrane" (Shaw) - 6:30  
 "Calling Miss Khadija" (Lee Morgan) - 6:40  
 "Nostrand and Fulton" (Hubbard) - 6:12  
 "Tomorrow's Destiny" (Shaw) - 7:06  
 "São Paulo" (Kenny Dorham) - 8:13  
 "Reets and I" (Benny Harris) - 6:40

Personnel
Freddie Hubbard - trumpet, flugelhorn
Woody Shaw - trumpet
Kenny Garrett - alto saxophone, flute
Mulgrew Miller - piano
Ray Drummond - bass 
Carl Allen - drums

See also
List of jazz contrafacts

References

1987 albums
Freddie Hubbard albums
Woody Shaw albums
Blue Note Records albums
Albums produced by Michael Cuscuna